Vindafjord is a municipality in Rogaland county, Norway. It is part of the traditional district of Haugaland. Since 2005, the administrative centre of the municipality has been the village of Ølensjøen (prior to that time it was the village of Sandeid). Other villages in the municipality include Bjoa, Imslandsjøen, Ølensvåg, Skjold, Vats, Vikebygd, and Vikedal. The municipality is centered on the Vindafjorden and Sandeidfjorden in the east and it lies north and east of the Skjoldafjorden in the west.

The  municipality is the 186th largest by area out of the 356 municipalities in Norway. Vindafjord is the 122nd most populous municipality in Norway with a population of 8,775.

General information
During the 1960s, there were many municipal mergers across Norway due to the work of the Schei Committee. On 1 January 1965, the new municipality of Vindafjord was created from several areas in northern Rogaland county:
all of Sandeid municipality (population: 876) 
the Liarheim og Langeland areas of Skjold municipality on the north side of the Skjoldafjorden (population: 1,262)
all of Vats municipality except for the Breidal and Stølsvik farms (population: 1,128)
 all of Imsland municipality located north of the Vindafjorden (population: 372)
 all of Vikedal municipality except for the Hapnes and Dokskar farms (population: 978)

Initially, Vindafjord had 4,616 residents. On 1 January 1969, the Sponevik farm (population: 6) was transferred from Vindafjord to the neighboring municipality of Tysvær. Then on 1 January 1978, the Vormestrand area along the southern shore of the Vindafjorden (population: 13) was transferred to neighboring Suldal municipality.

On 1 January 2006, Vindafjord merged with the neighboring municipality of Ølen (population: 3,420). Ølen had transferred from Hordaland county to Rogaland county 2002. After the merger, the municipal centre of Vindafjord was moved from Sandeid to the village of Ølensjøen, which had been the administrative centre of Ølen.

Name
The municipality (created in 1965) is named after the Vindafjorden, a fjord that runs through the eastern part of the municipality. The first element is probably derived from the verb vinda which means "turn" or "twist" referring to the sharp turn of the fjord at Dragneset.

Coat of arms
The coat of arms were granted on 10 March 2006, shortly after the merger of Ølen with Vindafjord. The new arms are a mix of the old arms of the two municipalities before the merger. The swirling design is taken from the old coat-of-arms of Ølen and the colours (red and silver/white) are from the old arms of Vindafjord. The swirling design of the arms show in a symbolized way all the roads that come together in the municipality. The municipality thus is an important centre of trade.

Churches
The Church of Norway has eight parishes within the municipality of Vindafjord. It is part of the Haugaland prosti (deanery) in the Diocese of Stavanger.

Government
All municipalities in Norway, including Vindafjord, are responsible for primary education (through 10th grade), outpatient health services, senior citizen services, unemployment and other social services, zoning, economic development, and municipal roads. The municipality is governed by a municipal council of elected representatives, which in turn elect a mayor.  The municipality falls under the Haugaland og Sunnhordland District Court and the Gulating Court of Appeal.

Municipal council
The municipal council of Vindafjord is made up of 25 representatives that are elected to four year terms. Currently, the party breakdown is as follows:

Geography
The municipality of Vindafjord lies south of the Hardangerfjorden and north of the Skjoldafjorden and Vindafjorden. The Sandeidfjorden flows through the municipality also. The lake Vatsvatnet lies in the central part of the municipality. The municipality sits near the base of the Haugalandet peninsula, connecting the mainland to the city of Haugesund on the western end of the peninsula. The European route E134 highway runs through the municipality.

Notable people 
 Knud Baade (1808 in Skjold - 1879) a Norwegian painter of portraits and landscapes, particularly moonlight paintings
 Jens Hundseid (1883 in Vikedal – 1965) a Norwegian politician, Prime Minister of Norway 1932 to 1933; joined Nasjonal Samling in 1940
 Thormod Næs (1930 in Skjold – 1997) a sport shooter, competed at the 1964 Summer Olympics 
 Per Øyvind Heradstveit (1932 in Skjold – 2004) a Norwegian TV journalist and non-fiction writer 
 Agnes Ravatn (born 1983 in Ølen) a Norwegian novelist, columnist and journalist

Gallery

References

External links
Municipal fact sheet from Statistics Norway 

 
Municipalities of Rogaland
1965 establishments in Norway